Shevchenkivskyi District is a right-bank urban district of the city of Dnipro, located in southern Ukraine. It is formerly known as Babushkinskyi District.

History
The district was formed on 12 April 1973 from the territory of Zhovtnevyi, Kirovskyi and Krasnohvardiiskyi districts and was named after Russian Bolshevik revolutionary Ivan Babushkin. On 26 November 2015 the district was renamed by the Dnipropetrovsk city council to its current name to comply with decommunization laws. The district is now named after the poet, writer, artist and political figure Taras Shevchenko.

Notable places

 Dnipro Main Post Office
 Dnipro City Council
 Holy Trinity Orthodox Cathedral

Neighborhoods 

 City centre (TsUM)
 Pidstantsiia
 12th Kvartal
 Topolia
 Koreia
 Myrne
 Mlyny
 Krotova

Main streets 

 Prospekt Dmytra Yavornytskoho (Dmytro Yavornytsky Avenue), former Yekaterininsky and Karla Marksa 
 Sicheslavska naberezhna (Sicheslav Embankment), former Naberezhna Lenina
 Vulytsia Sviatoslava Khorobroho (Sviatoslav the Brave Street), former Bazarna and Chkalova
 Vulytsia Mykhaila Hrushevskoho (Mykhailo Hrushevsky Street), former Kazanska and Karla Libknekhta
 Vulytsia Sichovykh Striltsiv (Sich Riflemen Street), former Oleksandrivska and Artema
 Prospekt Bohdana Khmelnytskoho (Bohdan Khmelnytsky Avenue), former Dnipropetrovska street and Heroiv Stalinhrada street
 Vulytsia Panikakhy (Panikakha Street)
 Zaporizke Shose (Zaporizhzhia Chaussée)
Note: In May 2015 President of Ukraine Petro Poroshenko signed a bill into law that started a six-month period for the removal of communist monuments and the mandatory renaming of settlements with a name related to Communism. Hence Topograph in Dnipro was renamed in order to comply with these decommunization law. The city's name also changed from Dnipropetrovsk to its current name Dnipro in 2016.

Gallery

References

Urban districts of Dnipro